The Palawan treeshrew (Tupaia palawanensis) is a treeshrew species endemic to the Palawan Island, Philippines, where it occurs from sea level to an elevation of . The population is considered steady. Formerly, it was considered a subspecies of the common treeshrew.

Habitat and ecology
This species occurs in jungles rich with fresh water and rivers. It also can be found in agriculture or farming zones, for example, cashew and coconut farms, brushy regions, and logged-over areas.  No threats to this species are known.

References

Treeshrews
Mammals of the Philippines
Mammals described in 1894
Taxa named by Oldfield Thomas
Endemic fauna of the Philippines
Fauna of Palawan
Taxonomy articles created by Polbot